Graciela Casillas (born 1957) is an American former boxer and kickboxer who competed in the bantamweight division. After training in several traditional martial arts, Casillas began competing as a kickboxer in 1976, and in 1979 she became the first fighter to hold world titles in both boxing and kickboxing by taking the World Women's Boxing Association's and the World Kickboxing Association's bantamweight championships. Although Casillas' Boxrec record is 5-0, Black Belt Magazine reported in May 1984 that she had 27 boxing matches, winning 15 by KO up to that point.

Noted for her punching power and also as one of the first American fighters to incorporate low kicks into their arsenal, Casillas retired undefeated in 1986. She is considered a pioneer of women's combat sports.

Early life
Casillas was born as one of eleven children to Mexican parents in Oxnard, California. She took up taekwondo at the age of fifteen when the church she attended began offering self-defense classes. After the classes were discontinued, she began training in Hwa Rang Do and then American Kenpo karate. It was at her karate school where she was introduced to kickboxing.

Career
After going 6-0 with all of her wins by knockout as an amateur, Casillas turned professional in 1977. On June 13, 1979, after winning her first eight professional full contact karate fights,  she defeated Karen Bennett by unanimous decision at the Grand Olympic Auditorium in Los Angeles, California to win the WWBA World Bantamweight (-53.525 kg/118 lb) Championship in what was her professional boxing debut.

Later that year, on December 23, she beat Irene Garcia to take the WKA Women's World Bantamweight (-53.5 kg/117.9 lb) title in Las Vegas, Nevada. This made her the first person to hold world titles in boxing and kickboxing simultaneously.

In a controversial bout in Chicago, Illinois on October 6, 1981, Casillas went the distance with Cheryl Wheeler. Initially, it was announced that Wheeler won on the judges' scorecards to take the WKA bantamweight title but it was later overturned to a win for Casillas.

She retired undefeated in 1986 with a record of 31-0, 18 KOs.

After, retirement Casillas taught martial arts at Oxnard College. She also pursued a different career route when she decided to go into the counseling department at Oxnard College. Now, Casillas is the Counseling Dept Chair at Oxnard College, and occasionally teaches courses in the PE Department.

Personal life
Casillas has spent the years following her retirement from competition developing her own eclectic martial art of Shen Chun Do, "the way of the warrior spirit".

Originally a student of taekwondo and full-contact karate she earned a 3rd degree black belt in Kenpo as well as Kodenkan Jujitsu. Casillas trained under Grandmaster Angel Cabales and became the first woman instructor for Cabales Serrada Eskrima. She later studied Jeet Kune Do under Sifu Dan Inosanto and Arnis under Grandmaster Bobby Taboada and her husband Sensei Ernie Boggs. She has been President of the United States Sport Jujitsu Trade Association and an assistant coach to the USA Jujitsu Team. She was awarded Black Belt Magazine's and Inside Kung-Fu Magazine's  "Woman of the Year" in 1989 and inducted into the Martial Arts Hall of Fame.  In 2020, she was inducted into the International Women's Boxing Hall of Fame. She has been credited as the designer of the Boxing Skirt.

In 1996 Casillas designed a knife known as the Ladyhawk, manufactured by Masters of Defense (MOD) as a collaboration with Microtech Knives and marketed as a self-defense knife designed for women.  Impetus for this design came after Casillas stabbed one of two attempted rapists, using the thug's own knife after disarming him.

Casillas has appeared in the films Full Impact (1993) and Fire in the Night (1986).

Championships and awards

Boxing
World Women's Boxing Association
WWBA World Bantamweight (-53.525 kg/118 lb) Championship

Kickboxing
World Kickboxing Association
WKA Women's World Bantamweight (-53.5 kg/117.9 lb) Championship

Boxing record

|-
|-  bgcolor="#CCFFCC"
| 1986-02-25 || Win ||align=left| Tanya McCloud || The Forum || Inglewood, California, US || Decision (unanimous) || 4 || 2:00 || 5-0-1
|-
|-  bgcolor="#CCFFCC"
| 1983-01-27 || Win ||align=left| Lanay Browning || || Las Vegas, Nevada, US || KO || 3 || || 4-0-1
|-
|-  bgcolor="#CCFFCC"
| 1980-09-18 || Win ||align=left| Debra Wright || || Tucson, Arizona, US || KO || 3 || || 3-0-1
|-
|-  bgcolor="#CCFFCC"
| 1980-06-25 || Win ||align=left| Anna Pascal || Silver Slipper || Paradise, Nevada, US || Decision (unanimous) || 6 || 2:00 || 2-0-1
|-
|- style="background:#c5d2ea;"
| 1979-11-23 || Draw ||align=left| Karen Bennett || San Diego Coliseum || San Diego, California, US || Draw || || || 1-0-1
|-
|-  bgcolor="#CCFFCC"
| 1979-07-13 || Win ||align=left| Karen Bennett || Grand Olympic Auditorium || Los Angeles, California, US || Decision (unanimous) || 6 || 2:00 || 1-0
|-
! style=background:white colspan=9 |
|-
|-
| colspan=9 | Legend:

Kickboxing record

|-
|-  bgcolor="#CCFFCC"
| 1981-10-06 || Win ||align=left| Cheryl Wheeler || || Chicago, Illinois, US || Decision || 7 || 2:00
|-
! style=background:white colspan=9 |
|-
|-  bgcolor="#CCFFCC"
| 1981-04-09 || Win ||align=left| Chan Lai Yin || || Hong Kong || TKO || || 
|-
|-  bgcolor="#CCFFCC"
| 1981-03-10 || Win ||align=left| Cookie Melendez || || || Decision || 7 || 2:00
|-
! style=background:white colspan=9 |
|-
|-  bgcolor="#CCFFCC"
| 1980-10-18 || Win ||align=left| Darlina Valdez || || || Decision || 7 || 2:00
|-
! style=background:white colspan=9 |
|-
|-  bgcolor="#CCFFCC"
| 1980-06-16 || Win ||align=left| Darlena Valdez || || Mexico || Decision || 7 || 2:00
|-
! style=background:white colspan=9 |
|-
|-  bgcolor="#CCFFCC"
| 1980-03-29 || Win ||align=left| Rochelle Reggsdale || || || TKO || || 
|-
! style=background:white colspan=9 |
|-
|-  bgcolor="#CCFFCC"
| 1979-12-23 || Win ||align=left| Irene Garcia || || Las Vegas, Nevada, US || Decision || 7 || 2:00
|-
! style=background:white colspan=9 |
|-
|-  bgcolor="#CCFFCC"
| 1979-11-16 || Win ||align=left| Gina Troy || || || Decision || || 
|-
|-  bgcolor="#CCFFCC"
| 1978-12-29 || Win ||align=left| Gina Troy || || || TKO || || 
|-
|- style="background:#c5d2ea;"
| 1978-09-01 || Draw ||align=left| Valerie Gardner || || || Draw || || 
|-
|-  bgcolor="#CCFFCC"
| 1978-07-29 || Win ||align=left| Linda Costineda || || || TKO || || 
|-
|-  bgcolor="#CCFFCC"
| 1978-01-21 || Win ||align=left| Jeanie Harris || || || TKO || || 
|-
|-  bgcolor="#CCFFCC"
| 1977-06-26 || Win ||align=left| Cheryl Altmore || || || KO || || 
|-
|-  bgcolor="#CCFFCC"
| 1977-05-14 || Win ||align=left| Ana Maria Garza || || || TKO || || 
|-
|-  bgcolor="#CCFFCC"
| 1977-02-12 || Win ||align=left| Joanna Mitchell || || || TKO || || 
|-
|-  bgcolor="#CCFFCC"
| 1976-10-23 || Win ||align=left| Crystal Lee || || || TKO || || 
|-
|-
| colspan=9 | Legend:

See also
 List of female boxers
 List of female kickboxers

References

External links
 Graciela Casillas at Awakening Fighters
 

1957 births
Living people
American women boxers
Boxers from California
Bantamweight boxers
American female kickboxers
Kickboxers from California
Bantamweight kickboxers
American Jeet Kune Do practitioners
American jujutsuka
American female karateka
American Kenpo practitioners
American female taekwondo practitioners
Sportspeople from Oxnard, California
American sportspeople of Mexican descent
Sportspeople from Ventura County, California